Kulathur, Kulathoor, or Kulattur may refer to a number of villages in India:

 Kulathoor, Neyyattinkara, Thiruvananthapuram district, Kerala
 Kulathur, Pathanamthitta, Pathanamthitta district, Kerala
 Kulathur taluk in Pudukkottai district of Tamil Nadu
 Kulathur, Gandharvakottai, Pudukkottai, Tamil Nadu
 Kulattur, Aranthangi, Pudukkottai, Tamil Nadu
 Kulattur, Avudayarkoil, Pudukkottai, Tamil Nadu